The 1998 Mobiline Phone Pals season was the ninth season of the franchise in the Philippine Basketball Association (PBA).

Draft

Occurrences
Mobiline coach Tommy Manotoc has hired three-time MVP William Adornado as one of his assistant coaches at the start of the season.

Beginning the Commissioner's Cup on May 22, former Purefoods coach Eric Altamirano signed a four-year contract to coach the Mobiline Phone Pals. Altamirano's contract with Purefoods expired last March 31.

Notable dates
February 8: Andy Seigle nailed a baseline jumper in the final 25 seconds and made a crucial steal afterwards as Mobiline redeemed itself from their first game blowout loss to Gordon's Gin by nipping defending champion Purefoods Carne Norte Beefies, 67-64.

March 8: Al Solis shot seven triples, one short of his own personal record to finish with a game-high 27 points as Mobiline keeps its hopes alive for a semifinals berth in the All-Filipino Cup with an 89-77 win over San Miguel Beermen and give the Phone Pals its fourth win in 10 games. Prior to the game, the Phone Pals have lost their last four assignments.

May 29: After losing their first two games in the Commissioners Cup with Alex Fraser as their import, Fraser was replaced by their original choice Terquin Mott, who debut with 50 points in giving the Phone Pals their first win in a 94-90 victory over Shell.

Centennial Cup title
Mobiline finally captured a PBA title in a "bonus" tournament called Centennial Cup, the Phone Pals defeated Formula Shell, 67-66, in the one-game finale.

Runner-up finish
The perfect combination of imports Silas Mills and Artemus McClary led Mobiline to the Governor's Cup finals in a rematch with Formula Shell. The Phone Pals played without national team members Jeffrey Cariaso and Andy Seigle for the whole conference, they lost in the championship series that went into a full limit of seven games.

Awards
Silas Mills was named Governors Cup Best Import.
Patrick Fran was voted the season's Most Improved Player.

Roster

Transactions

Trades

Addition

Subtractions

Recruited imports

References

TNT Tropang Giga seasons
Mobiline